Adam Gardiner (born 13 December 1966) is a New Zealand voice, film and television actor, most notable for his voice roles in Power Rangers. He voiced the Evil White Ranger Clone in Power Rangers Dino Thunder, Kamdor in Power Rangers Operation Overdrive, and Sledge in Power Rangers Dino Charge.

Education
Gardiner graduated from Victoria University of Wellington in 1995 with a Bachelor of Arts in Theatre and Film.

Filmography

Film 
 Hopeless (2000) as Richard
 For Good (2003) as Flatmate
 Futile Attraction (2004) as Chef
 River Queen (2005) as Baine's Lieutenant
 Eagle vs Shark (2007) as Tony

Television 
 Duggan (1999) as Robert MacLllwaine (1 episode: "Going Overboard")
 Love Bites (2002) as Richard
 The Strip (2002-2003) as Slater (3 episodes)
 Power Rangers Dino Thunder (2004) as White Ranger Clone (voice) (10 episodes)
 Outrageous Fortune (2005) as Murray (1 episode: "The Fat Weed That Roots Itself")
 Power Rangers Mystic Force (2006) as Chimera #1 (voice) (2 episodes)
 Power Rangers Operation Overdrive (2007) as Kamdor (14 episodes)
 Power Rangers Operation Overdrive (2007) as Loki (1 episode: "It's Hammer Time")
 Power Rangers Jungle Fury (2008) as Toady (3 episodes)
 Burying Brian (2008) as Suit #1 (1 episode)
 Longing for New Zealand (2009) as Pilot (Television film)
 Go Girls (2009) as Lesley (1 episode: Dream Believers)
 The Rogers Family Xmas (2010) as Kent
 The Almighty Johnsons (2011) as Brian (1 episode: "Bad Things Happen")
 Tangiwai (2011) as Frank Mooney (Television film)
 Bliss (2011) as Charles the manservant (Television film)
 Power Rangers Samurai (2012) as Skarf (voice) (1 episode: "Kevin's Choice")
 Siege (2012) as Nigel Formosa (Television film) 
 Sunny Skies (2013) as Lawyer (1 episode)
 Spartacus: War of the Damned (2013) as Mummius (1 episode: "Men of Honor")
 Agent Anna (2013–present) as Leon Cruickshank (Main cast, 6 episodes)
 Power Rangers Megaforce (2013-2014) as Shadow Serpent (voice) (1 episode: "Man and Machine") and Cybaxx (voice) (1 episode: "Earth Fights Back")
 Power Rangers Dino Charge (2015-2016) as Sledge (voice) (25 episodes) and Reporter (2 episodes: "Besties 4Eva!", "Catching Some Rays")
 Power Rangers Super Ninja Steel (2018) as Sledge (voice) (2 episodes: "Echoes of Evil", "The Poisy Show") and Agent 00 Sven (1 episode: "Car Trouble")
 Power Rangers Beast Morphers (2020) as Sledge (voice) (2 episodes: "Finders Keepers", "Making Bad")

References

External links

1966 births
Living people
New Zealand male film actors
New Zealand male television actors
New Zealand male voice actors
Victoria University of Wellington alumni
20th-century New Zealand male actors
21st-century New Zealand male actors